Division No. 10 is one of eighteen census divisions in the province of Saskatchewan, Canada, as defined by Statistics Canada. It is located in the east-central part of the province. The most populous community in this division is Wynyard.

Demographics 

Census subdivisions 
The following census subdivisions (municipalities or municipal equivalents) are located within Saskatchewan's Division No. 10.

Cities
none

Towns
Foam Lake
Ituna
Leroy
Raymore
Wadena
Watson
Wynyard

Villages

Elfros
Hubbard
Jansen
Kelliher
Leross
Lestock
Margo
Punnichy
Quill Lake
Quinton
Semans

Resort villages
Chorney Beach
Leslie Beach

Rural municipalities

 RM No. 246 Ituna Bon Accord
 RM No. 247 Kellross
 RM No. 248 Touchwood
 RM No. 276 Foam Lake
 RM No. 277 Emerald
 RM No. 279 Mount Hope
 RM No. 307 Elfros
 RM No. 308 Big Quill
 RM No. 309 Prairie Rose
 RM No. 336 Sasman
 RM No. 337 Lakeview
 RM No. 338 Lakeside
 RM No. 339 Leroy
Source: Statistics Canada 2002 2001 Community Profiles

Indian reserves

 Beardy's and Okemasis 96 and 97A
 Day Star 87
 Fishing Lake 89
 Fishing Lake 89A
 Gordon 86
 Muskowekwan 85
 Muskowekwan 85-1
 Muskowekwan 85-10
 Muskowekwan 85-12
 Muskowekwan 85-15
 Muskowekwan 85-17
 Muskowekwan 85-22
 Muskowekwan 85-23
 Muskowekwan 85-24
 Muskowekwan 85-26
 Muskowekwan 85-27
 Muskowekwan 85-28
 Muskowekwan 85-29
 Muskowekwan 85-2A
 Muskowekwan 85-31
 Muskowekwan 85-33
 Muskowekwan 85-8
 Poorman 88
Source: Statistics Canada 2002 2001 Community Profiles.

See also 
List of census divisions of Saskatchewan
List of communities in Saskatchewan

References

Division No. 10, Saskatchewan Statistics Canada

 
10